Pawlica is a Polish surname. Notable people with the surname include:

 Jan Pawlica (1923–1972), Polish alpine skier
 Karol Pawlica (1884–1970), Polish agronomist and diplomat

Polish-language surnames